Thomas Miles Adams (2 May 1808 – 20 January 1894) was an English cricketer who played in the mid-19th century. He was a member of the great Kent county cricket teams of the 1840s and played for both MCC and various All-England Elevens. He was a right-handed batsman who bowled roundarm style.

Adams was born in Gravesend in Kent. He made his debut in the 1836 season and is known to have made 157 appearances in matches which were later given first-class cricket status between 1836 and 1858. He played for Kent both before the first county club was formed in 1842 and afterwards for Kent County Cricket Club. He stood as umpire in 20 top-class matches from 1852 to 1865.

Adams is believed to have laid down the wicket at the Bat and Ball Ground in Gravesend in 1845 and operated the ground, possibly along with another a local cricketer William Smith. This formed the basis of the ground which was used by Kent for county matches between 1849 and 1971. He died at Gravesend in 1894 aged 83.

Notes

References

External links

1808 births
1894 deaths
English cricketers
United All-England Eleven cricketers
English cricketers of 1826 to 1863
Kent cricketers
Sportspeople from Gravesend, Kent
North v South cricketers
Hampshire cricketers
Marylebone Cricket Club cricketers
English cricket umpires
Manchester Cricket Club cricketers
West of England cricketers
Non-international England cricketers
Players cricketers
Gentlemen of Kent cricketers
All-England Eleven cricketers
Married v Single cricketers